Vinagre is a discontinued VNC, SSH, RDP and SPICE client for the GNOME desktop environment.

It may also refer to:
Boquerones en vinagre, a type of appetizer found in Spain
Vinagre, Cape Verde, a village in the island of Brava, Cape Verde
Estádio Leonardo Vinagre da Silveira, an association football stadium located in João Pessoa, Paraíba, Brazil
David Vinagre Cristina (born 1978), Portuguese humorist
Elizeu Antonio Ferreira Vinagre Godoy (born 1945), Brazilian footballer
Roberto Pimenta Vinagre Filho (born 1992), Brazilian footballer
Rúben Vinagre (born 1999), Portuguese footballer

Portuguese-language surnames